Nationality words link to articles with information on the nation's poetry or literature (for instance, Irish or France).

Events
 William Winstanley publishes the Lives of the most famous English poets from which biographical data on a number of poets can be obtained

Works published

Great Britain
 John Cutts, (later Baron Cutts), Poetical Exercises written on several occasions, published anonymously
 John Dryden:
 The Hind and the Panther, published anonymously (see also the work by Matthew Prior and Charles Montagu, below)
 A Song for St. Cecilia's Day
 Thomas D'Urfey, A Compleat Collection of Mr D'Urfey's Songs and Odes
 John Norris, A Collection of Miscellanies, prose and poetry
 Matthew Prior and Charles Montagu, The Hind and the Panther Transvers'd to the Story of the Country-Mouse and the City-Mouse, published anonymously, a burlesque of John Dryden's The Hind and the Panther (see above)
 Thomas Shadwell, translator, The Tenth Satyr of Juvenal, with English and Latin on facing pages

Other
 John Cotton II, Poem Occasioned by the Death of [...] John Alden, English Colonial American (Massachusetts)
 Benjamin Harris, compiler, The New England Primer, English Colonial American

Births
Death years link to the corresponding "[year] in poetry" article:
 June 13 – Paolo Rolli (died  1765), Italian librettist, poet and translator
 c. August 26 – Henry Carey (suicide 1743), English poet, dramatist and songwriter
 Mary Chandler (died 1745), English poet and milliner

Deaths
Birth years link to the corresponding "[year] in poetry" article:
 March 28 – Constantijn Huygens (born 1596), Dutch poet and composer
 April 16 – George Villiers, 2nd Duke of Buckingham (born 1628), English statesman and poet
 April 28 – Charles Cotton (born 1630), English poet and writer
 May 6 – Thomas Washbourne (born 1606), English clergyman and poet
 September 1 – Henry More (born 1614), English philosopher and poet
 October 21 – Edmund Waller (born 1606), English poet and politician
 Pierre Petit (born 1617), French scholar, physician, poet and Latin writer

See also

 Poetry
 17th century in poetry
 17th century in literature
 Restoration literature

Notes

17th-century poetry
Poetry